Spirit of the American Navy was a World War I monument created by sculptor E. M. Viquesney in 1927.  It was intended to be a companion piece to his very popular, Spirit of the American Doughboy, but never attained that stature, occurring in only seven known locations, with an eighth held in private ownership.

Editions

 Memorial Park Bridge, Palatka, Florida  1927 (variant version holding artillery shell instead of waving cap)
 Clearwater Memorial Causeway Park, Clearwater, Florida  1927
 Mohave County Courthouse, Kingman, Arizona  1928
 Memorial Park, Fort Wayne, Indiana  1928
 Granite, Oklahoma,  1929
 Hobart, Oklahoma  1929
 Crowell, Texas  1932 (stone version)
 Naperville, Illinois; purchased from a private owner in Pentwater, Michigan in 2013, and dedicated in Burlington Square Park on October 13, 2013, the 238th birthday of the United States Navy.

References

External links
Research on Viquesney sculptures

Military monuments and memorials in the United States
Buildings and structures completed in 1927
Outdoor sculptures in Florida
World War I memorials in the United States
Copper sculptures in the United States
Outdoor sculptures in Arizona
Outdoor sculptures in Indiana
Outdoor sculptures in Oklahoma
Outdoor sculptures in Texas